Venus Castina ('Chaste Venus') from Latin castus, is claimed to be an epithet of the Roman goddess Venus; in this form, she was supposedly associated with "the yearnings of feminine souls locked up in male bodies".

Cesare Lombroso wrote that at Rome, the Venus of the sodomites received the title of Castina. Although no evidence of the epithet appears to exist prior to the 19th century, Clarence Joseph Bulliet wrote a book about homosexuality and cross-dressing named after this supposed epithet. In the book, he ascribes the influence of "the effeminate" to a range of activities.

The priest of the gods, from history's dawn in Asia and Egypt down to the richly-robed Roman prelates of today, have set themselves conspicuously apart from their fellow males by the assumption of female attire.

The chaste Venus, or, to use another expression, the triumphant, sacred virgin, shared the characteristics of the unconquered and the invincible Diana. Diana when seen in her nakedness, and therefore made profane, could wreak cures or other terrible retribution, such as that inflicted on Actaeon who was torn to pieces by the avenging demons in the shape of his own hounds. The chaste Venus (if the idea of Venus is ever that of chastity) was the "Venus Urania", or the Venus of the stars, or of heaven.

Herodotus wrote that Aphrodite Urania cursed a group of Scythians who pillaged Venus's temple at Ascalon by rendering them effeminate.

"So they turned back, and when they came on their way to the city of Ascalon in Syria, most of the Scythians passed by and did no harm, but a few remained behind and plundered the temple of Heavenly Aphrodite. This temple, I discover from making inquiry, is the oldest of all the temples of the goddess, for the temple in Cyprus was founded from it, as the Cyprians themselves say; and the temple on Cythera was founded by Phoenicians from this same land of Syria. But the Scythians who pillaged the temple, and all their descendants after them, were afflicted by the goddess with the “female” sickness: and so the Scythians say that they are afflicted as a consequence of this and also that those who visit Scythian territory see among them the condition of those whom the Scythians call “Hermaphrodites”. — The Histories, book I, chapter 105. Herodotus.

Hippocrates, describing among the Scythians "No-men" who resembled eunuchs, wrote, "they not only follow women's occupations, but show feminine inclinations and behave as women. The natives ascribe the cause to a deity..." (cited by Hammond, 1887).

See also 
Venus Barbata

References

External links 
 Venus Castina @ Everything2.com

Androgynous and hermaphroditic deities
Venus (mythology)